"Controvento" (English: Against the wind) is a song recorded by Italian singer Arisa. Written by Giuseppe Anastasi, the song was produced by Carlo Ubaldo Rossi. Released in Italy on 18 February 2014 as the lead single of Arisa's fourth studio album Se vedo te, the song was commercially successful in Italy after winning the Sanremo Music Festival 2014, debuting at number one on the FIMI Singles Chart and being certified platinum for domestic downloads exceeding 30,000.

Charts

References

2014 songs
2014 singles
Number-one singles in Italy
Sanremo Music Festival songs
Italian pop songs
Warner Music Group singles
Arisa songs
Songs written by Giuseppe Anastasi